Luca Strizzolo (born 29 April 1992) is an Italian professional footballer who plays as a forward for  club Modena, on loan from Cremonese.

Club career
He made his professional debut in the Lega Pro for Pisa on 25 September 2011 in a game against Pro Vercelli.

On 18 January 2013, he was loaned to Treviso in Serie C.

On 12 July 2019, he returned to Pordenone on loan for the 2019–20 season.

On 18 August 2022, Strizzolo was loaned to Perugia, with an option to buy. On 10 January 2023, he moved on a new loan to Modena.

References

External links
 

1992 births
Sportspeople from Udine
Footballers from Friuli Venezia Giulia
Living people
Italian footballers
Association football forwards
Pisa S.C. players
Serie C players
Serie B players
Treviso F.B.C. 1993 players
Real Vicenza V.S. players
S.S.D. Lucchese 1905 players
Pordenone Calcio players
A.S. Cittadella players
U.S. Cremonese players
A.C. Perugia Calcio players
Modena F.C. 2018 players